Rutilus is a genus of fish in the family Cyprinidae found in Eurasia. This genus is a widely distributed lineage of cyprinids and ranges from West Europe to East Siberia.

Species
In FishBase (2022), nine species are included in the genus:
 Rutilus caspicus (Yakovlev, 1870) (Caspian roach)
 Rutilus frisii (Nordmann, 1840) (Black sea roach)
 Rutilus heckelii (Nordmann, 1840)
 Rutilus kutum (S. N. Kamensky, 1901) (Caspian kutum)
 Rutilus meidingeri (Heckel, 1851)
 Rutilus pigus (Lacépède, 1803) (Pigo)
 Rutilus rutilus (Linnaeus, 1758) (Common roach)
 Rutilus stoumboudae Bianco & Ketmaier, 2014 
 Rutilus virgo (Heckel, 1852) (Cactus roach)

In a phylogeographic study, Levin et al. (2017) argue that the Ponto-Caspian taxa including R. caspicus, R. heckelii and R. stoumboudae could represent a single widespread species whose range extends to Siberia, to be named Rutilus lacustris, whereas R. kutum is included in R. frisii. 

The genera Leucos and Sarmarutilus have been recently separated from Rutilus'' and are closely related to it.

References

 
Cyprinidae genera
Taxa named by Constantine Samuel Rafinesque